Karašica may refer to:

 Karašica (Drava), a river in eastern Croatia
 Karašica (Danube), a river in southern Hungary and eastern Croatia

See also 
 Karasica